John Charles Martin (4 November 1797 - 17 January 1878) was a 19th-century Anglican priest in Ireland.

Martin was born in Cork and educated at Trinity College, Dublin. He was Archdeacon of Kilmore from 1866 until his death.

References

19th-century Irish Anglican priests
Archdeacons of Kilmore
Alumni of Trinity College Dublin
1878 deaths
1797 births
Clergy from Cork (city)